Otu Udofa, professionally known as Lemmy Jackson, is a Nigerian music producer who produced songs for many prominent Nigerians artists of the 1980s. He produced Wait for Me a duet by Onyeka Onwenu and King Sunny Adé, he also worked with Alex O, the Mandators, Tera Kota and Ras Kimono.

Life 
Jackson was educated at QIC Primary School, Eket and at the Etinan Institute. He later studied Metallurgy in Russia before moving to England. In London, Jackson worked as a session musician, an encounter with Laolu Akins and his band BLO  led to him playing as a keyboardist for BLO. His career took off in 1981 after he was hired as an in-house producer by Pail Aifuwa, a businessman who had founded a new record label, Time Communications in Lagos. At Time, he produced Oby Onyioha's record I Want To Feel Your Love and also Tonight, Jackson's debut album. In addition, Jackson performed production duties on Christy Essien-Igbokwe's Ever Liked My Person. Both his record and that of Onyioha were recorded at Haruna Isbola's Phondisk Studio in Ijebu-Ode and as was common in that era it was sent to London for mixing.

Jackson later joined EMI and got into producing reggae records. He was a session musician and producer on Ras Kimono's What's Gwan? and produced Tera Kota's Lamentation of Sodom in 1984. He also contributed production wise to The Mandators third album Rebel and also produced Majek Fashek's Send Down the Rain

References 

Year of birth missing (living people)
Living people
Nigerian record producers